Agbokim waterfalls are situated in the Etung local government area of Cross River State in the South-South (Niger delta) region of Nigeria, very close to its border with Cameroon.

See also 

Ikom monoliths
Obudu Mountain Resort

References

Waterfalls of Nigeria
Tourist attractions in Nigeria
Tourist attractions in Cross River State
Cross River (Nigeria)